Gwennan Mary Harries (born 5 January 1988) is a former Welsh football striker who had two spells with FA WSL club Bristol Academy, split by three seasons away playing for Everton. She was born in Bridgend and won 56 caps for the Wales women's national football team, scoring 18 goals.

Club career
Harries played for Cardiff City and Bristol Academy before joining Everton Ladies in July 2009. She won an FA Women's Cup winner's medal in 2010, but did not play in the final. Harries returned to Bristol Academy in February 2013.

Her Cardiff City debut came versus Newton Abbot in October 2002, and she scored 15 goals in her debut season.

International career
Harries won 21 caps for the Wales Under–19 side, scoring nine goals. She made her senior debut against Moldova in the 2005–06 season. As a student at UWIC, Harries has twice represented Great Britain in the World University Games, playing in the 2007 tournament in Bangkok and in the 2009 tournament in Belgrade.

Harries expressed disappointment at the Welsh FA refusing to allow its players to represent a Great Britain Olympic football team at the 2012 London Olympics. In February 2011, fluent Welsh speaker Harries was appointed as a Welsh FA ambassador for female football.

A knee injury sustained in November 2012 before a friendly with the Netherlands eventually brought about Harries's retirement, after a three-year struggle to regain fitness. She said: "the decision was made with a heavy heart but a realistic head".

International goals

Personal life
In 2012 Harries qualified and began working as a PE teacher at Cardiff High School. She became the first female pundit on S4C's Sgorio in March 2015.
And now works at Ysgol Gyfun Gymraeg Glantaf

References

External links
 

Welsh women's footballers
Wales women's international footballers
Cardiff City Ladies F.C. players
Bristol Academy W.F.C. players
Everton F.C. (women) players
FA Women's National League players
1988 births
Footballers from Bridgend
Welsh-language broadcasters
Living people
Expatriate women's footballers in England
Women's Super League players
Women's association football forwards
Universiade bronze medalists for Great Britain
Universiade medalists in football
Medalists at the 2009 Summer Universiade